The ARY Film Award for Best Film is one of the ARY Film Awards of Merit presented annually by the ARY Digital Network and Entertainment Channel to producers working in the film industry and is the only category in which every member is eligible to submit a nomination. Best Film is considered the most important of the ARY Film Awards, as it represents all the directing, acting, music composing, writing, editing and other efforts put forth into a drama. This award is one of the two Best Film awards in ceremony which is awarded to relevant film only on the decision of ceremony Jury, while other being awarded on Viewers Voting's.

History

Category Name
The best film category originates with the 1st ARY Film Awards ceremony since 2014. This category has been given to the best film of previous year to the ceremony held by Viewers Voting, but simply called as Best Film, rather than Best Film Jury which is decided by Jury and officially called as Best Film Jury or Best Jury Film. Since ARY Film Awards has been just started, this category has not a brief history. The name of the category officially termed by the channel is:

 2014 → present: ARY Film Award for Best Film

Winners and nominees 

In the list below, winners are listed first in the colored row, followed by the other nominees. The year shown is the one in which the film first released; normally this is also the year before the ceremony at which the award is given; for example, a film exhibited theatrically during 2005 was eligible for consideration for the 2005 Best Film ARY Awards, awarded in 2006. The number of the ceremony (1st, 2nd, etc.) appears in parentheses after the awards year, linked to the article on that ceremony/ Each individual entry shows the title followed by the production company, and the producer. Till from 2013, the Best Drama Serial award has given to producer rather than to Production company.

As of the first ceremony, total of five films were nominated, and all the five films were nominated in all categories except one. This category is among two Best Film Awards that is given to Best Film's. Best Film Jury winner is eligible to be nominated among Best Film and may won the Both awards.

For the first ceremony, the eligibility period spanned full calendar years. For example, the 1st ARY Film Awards presented on May 35, 2015, to recognized films that were released between January, 2013, and December, 2013, the period of eligibility is the full previous calendar year from January 1 to December 31.

Date and the award ceremony shows that the 2010 is the period from 2010-2020 (10 years-decade), while the year above winners and nominees shows that the film year in which they were releases, and the figure in bracket shows the ceremony number, for example; an award ceremony is held for the films of its previous year.

2010s

References

External links 

 

Best Film ARY Film Award winners
ARY Film Award winners
ARY Film Awards